Badma Erdeni Khong Tayiji was a 17th-century Mongol prince of the Altyn Khan dynasty. Son of Ubasi Khong Tayiji, the first Altan Khan of Khalkha. In 1652, he abdicated the throne and his son Erinchin Lobsang Tayiji succeeded.

 

17th-century Mongol rulers
Year of death unknown
Year of birth unknown